The House of Wickersham, also known as the Wickersham State Historic Site, is a historic house at 213 7th Street in the Chicken Ridge area of Juneau, Alaska.  It is a historic house museum operated by the state of Alaska, memorializing the life of James Wickersham (1857-1939), an influential political leader in Alaska in the early 20th century.  The house, a -story frame structure, was built in 1899 by Frank Hammond, owner of a mining company.  It was purchased by Wickersham in 1928 and remained his home until his death.  The house has been operated, informally at first by Wickersham's niece, as a museum since 1958.  The house was purchased by the state in 1984.

The house was listed on the National Register of Historic Places in 1976 and was included as a contributing property to Chicken Ridge Historic District in 1995.

See also
National Register of Historic Places listings in Juneau, Alaska

References

External links

 Wickersham State Historic Site

1899 establishments in Alaska
Houses completed in 1899
Historic house museums in Alaska
Houses on the National Register of Historic Places in Alaska
Houses in Juneau, Alaska
Museums in Juneau, Alaska
Buildings and structures on the National Register of Historic Places in Juneau, Alaska
Historic district contributing properties in Alaska